Sudurağı station is a station in the Karaman Province of Turkey. TCDD Taşımacılık operates a daily intercity train from Konya to Adana, which stops at the station.

References

External links
Station timetable

Railway stations in Karaman Province
Railway stations opened in 1904
1904 establishments in the Ottoman Empire
Karaman Central District